The 2002 NCAA men's volleyball tournament was the 33rd annual tournament to determine the national champion of NCAA men's collegiate indoor volleyball. The single elimination tournament was played at Rec Hall in University Park, Pennsylvania during May 2002.

Hawaiʻi defeated Pepperdine in the final match, 3–1 (29–31, 31–29, 30–21, 30–24), to win their first national title. However, the NCAA Committee on Infractions ultimately vacated the Rainbow Warriors' tournament appearance, wins, and championship. The championship was not reawarded to Pepperdine. Hawaiʻi (24–8) was coached by Mike Wilton.

Hawaiʻi's Costas Theocharidis was originally named the tournament's Most Outstanding Player. However, this award was revoked when Hawaiʻi's title was vacated by the NCAA. Additionally, Theocharidis and teammate Tony Ching were both removed from the six-man All Tournament Team.

Qualification
Until the creation of the NCAA Men's Division III Volleyball Championship in 2012, there was only a single national championship for men's volleyball. As such, all NCAA men's volleyball programs, whether from Division I, Division II, or Division III, were eligible. A total of 4 teams were invited to contest this championship.

Note: Hawaiʻi's appearance, including their championship, was vacated by the NCAA Committee on Infractions.

Tournament bracket 
Site: Rec Hall, University Park, Pennsylvania

Note: Hawaiʻi's wins were all vacated by the NCAA Committee on Infractions.

All tournament team 
 Costas Theocharidis, Hawaiʻi (Most outstanding player) (Vacated)
Tony Ching, Hawaiʻi (Vacated)
Brad Keenan, Pepperdine
Lance Walker, Pepperdine
 Carlos Guerra, Penn State
Paul Fasshauer, Ball State

See also 
 NCAA Men's National Collegiate Volleyball Championship
 NCAA Women's Volleyball Championships (Division I, Division II, Division III)

References

2002
NCAA Men's Volleyball Championship
NCAA Men's Volleyball Championship
2002 in sports in Pennsylvania
Volleyball in Pennsylvania